The Swimming competition at the 1999 Pan American Games took place in the Pan Am Pool in Winnipeg, Manitoba, Canada, from August 2–7, 1999.

In 32 events, the USA team won 10 golds, 7 by the women: the last time either the U.S. men's or women's team won fewer than ten golds was 1963, when there were only eight events for each. But the U.S. didn't send its very best to Winnipeg. That honor went to the team that headed for Sydney, Australia at the 1999 Pan Pacific Swimming Championships.

Two swimmers won the first medals of their countries in swimming at Pan American Games at all times: Eileen Coparropa for Panama, and Janelle Atkinson for Jamaica.

Results

Men's events

Women’s events

Medal table

References
USA Swimming
Results
Folha Online
Folha

 
Swimming at the Pan American Games
Pan American Games
Events at the 1999 Pan American Games